Jean Thomson Westwood (1931 – 26 July 2022) was a British ice dancer. With partner Lawrence Demmy, she was the World Champion for four consecutive years, 1952 to 1955 (plus the unofficial trial event in 1951), and European Champion in its first two editions in 1954 and 1955.  They were inducted into the World Figure Skating Hall of Fame in 1977.

She later became an elite-level coach in the United States and Canada (she had switched national teams, via a spell as skating director of the Ice Follies touring show, prior to the 1961 Sabena Flight 548 aviation disaster in which several former students and colleagues were killed). She was inducted into the Skate Canada Hall of Fame for her coaching services in 1997. 

The Scottish long jumper Alix Jamieson (1964 Summer Olympics) was her second cousin.

Results
(with Lawrence Demmy)

References

British female ice dancers
1931 births 
2022 deaths
Date of birth missing
World Figure Skating Championships medalists
European Figure Skating Championships medalists
Sportspeople from Manchester
English people of Scottish descent
English emigrants to Canada
Figure skating coaches
English expatriate sportspeople in the United States
Naturalized citizens of Canada
Alumni of the University of Liverpool
People educated at Cheltenham Ladies' College